Ilian Sashov Todorov (in bulgarian language - Илиан Сашов Тодоров) is a Bulgarian politician from Attack. From 2011 he works as a regional coordinator in Attack for South-West Bulgaria. On the 2013 election he was leading the lists in two regions.

References

21st-century Bulgarian politicians
Living people
Year of birth missing (living people)